Ishiura is a Japanese surname. Notable people with the surname include:

, Japanese racing driver
, Japanese sumo wrestler
, Japanese footballer

Japanese-language surnames